Blood for Blood is an American hardcore punk band from Boston, Massachusetts. It was formed in 1994 by Erick "Buddha" Medina and "White Trash" Rob Lind, drawing inspiration from the hardcore scene in Boston and New York. In 1997, they were signed to Victory Records. The band describes its sound as influenced by Sheer Terror, Breakdown, Carnivore and Killing Time.

After their 2004 album was released, the band went on hiatus until 2010. Guitarist and songwriter Rob Lind decided touring with the band would be detrimental to his newfound sobriety, having been a heroin addict and alcoholic for many years, and feared a relapse. As a tour replacement, the band called upon Billy Graziadei from Biohazard to fill in on guitar duties in Lind's absence.

In 2011, the band mentioned Lind's possible return for another full-length album; however, in June 2012, vocalist Erick Medina was kicked out of the band due to being charged with raping a minor. The band has since been resurrected with Lind on vocals.

Band members

Current
 "White Trash" Rob Lind – guitar, vocals
 Ian McFarland – bass
 Robert Falzano – drums (2012)

Past
 Erick "Buddha" Medina – vocals (1994–2012)
 Mike "Cap'n" Mahoney – drums (1994–1999)
 Gina Benavides – bass (1996–1997)
 Greg Dellaria – bass (1995)
 Jeremy Wooden – bass (1994–1995)
 Dustin Hengst – drums (Outlaw Anthems)
 Neal Dike – drums (2004–2012)
 Craig Silverman – guitar (live) (2010–2012)
 Billy Graziadei – guitar (live) (2010)
 Shane Williams - vocals

Discography

References

External links
 Blood for Blood on the Thorp Records website
 Blood for Blood on the Victory Records website

Hardcore punk groups from Massachusetts
Victory Records artists